Andrea Chizoba "Chizzy" Akudolu  (born 7 October 1973) is a British actress.

Career 
In 2002, Akudolu was one of eight new comedy performers who won the BBC Talent Initiative, The Urban Sketch Showcase. All eight performed a comedy sketch show in front of BBC casting directors and producers at the Tabernacle Theatre in Notting Hill.  Her first television appearance was in the BBC sitcom 15 Storeys High. This was followed by a small role in EastEnders. She continued to work for the BBC in her first children's series called Stupid! and Roman's Empire. Credits also include Green Wing, Dustbin Baby for Kindle Entertainment and as a caricature of herself in the mockumentary The Most Unromantic Man in the World. Akudolu also played series regular Miss Kanouti in The Complete Guide to Parenting. She has continued to work for CBBC in programmes such as Nuzzle and Scratch, Scoop and Gigglebiz. In 2007, she toured with The Vagina Monologues for three months. In 2008, Akudolu played the housemate, Angel, in Dead Set, a satirical cross between Big Brother and zombies.  In 2009, she had a guest role in Hollyoaks Later and starred in the CBBC show Jinx in the lead role as the unconventional Fairy Godmother, Cookie. In 2010 Akudolu appeared in The Increasingly Poor Decisions of Todd Margaret, Twenty Twelve, The Inbetweeners, and as a semi-regular in the Channel 4 comedy Campus.

Since May 2012, Akudolu has played the role of the  surgeon Mo Effanga in Holby City. It has since been announced that Akudolu is departing Holby City after five years. She was nominated and won the award for "Best Newcomer" at the Black International Film Festival and Music Video & Screen Awards. She has also won the  Best Actress in the same year at BEFFTA Awards. She was nominated for the  "Emerging Talent" award at the 8th Annual Screen Nation Awards.

In 2017, Akudolu took part in Let's Sing and Dance for Comic Relief with a duo from Casualty. The trio performed "Uptown Funk" by Bruno Mars and came second place. In 2017, she took part in the fifteenth series of Strictly Come Dancing on BBC One. She was the first celebrity to be eliminated after a disappointing Foxtrot which lacked flow and the traditional format of the dance. Akudolu took part in The Weakest Link one-off celebrity episode for Children in Need. She was the strongest link in 5 out of the 6 rounds, and beat Rylan Clark-Neal in the final round to win, earning 1,130 pounds for Children in Need, which the programme doubled.

2018 saw Akudolu compete on Richard Osman's House of Games, televised on BBC Two, alongside Tom Allen, Charlie Higson, and Kate Williams. Having won one of the episodes in her week, she returned for a House of Champions special along with Miles Jupp, Amol Rajan and Ellie Taylor, broadcast in 2020.

In January 2019, Akudolu played Butterfly Brown in Death in Paradise.

In 2022, Akudolu competed in Celebrity hunted for Stand up to Cancer. She was caught 3rd in the series, her teammate Lisa Mafia was caught shortly after her.

She also made a guest appearance in ITV's sitcom Kate and Koji as Lisa.

Personal life 
She has a brown belt in karate and is an experienced calligrapher. Her mother was a midwife.

Filmography

References

External links 

1973 births
Living people
English television actresses
Actresses from London
People from Harlesden
Black British actresses
English people of Yoruba descent
English female karateka